Omar José Abdel Aziz (born November 9, 1958) is a Brazilian politician. He served as the Governor of the Brazilian state of Amazonas from March 31, 2010, to 2014, following the resignation of his predecessor, Eduardo Braga, to become a Senator. Member of a family of Arab and Italian descent, Omar has already held the post of Alderman in Manaus and Amazonas State Assemblyman in the 1990. In 1996, he was elected Deputy Mayor of Manaus with Alfredo Nascimento as holder in Office. In 2000, were re-elected, but in May 2002, Omar left the post to compete with Eduardo Braga plate to the State Government as deputy-governor, election in which they were elected. In 2006, he was reelected with Braga. In 2008 was apply for as mayor of Manaus by PMN, having won the third place. In 2010, with the resignation of Braga to the State Government to run for Senate, Aziz took over the Government. In the elections of that year, he was re-elected Governor in the first round with 64% of the vote. In 2011, was one of the co-founders of the Social Democratic Party (PSD). Did the same as Braga in 2014 leaving the office of Governor and your vice-Governor, José Melo de Oliveira, took the office.

References

1958 births
Living people
People from Garça
Brazilian people of Arab descent
Brazilian people of Italian descent
Brazilian people of Lebanese descent
Reform Progressive Party politicians
Progressistas politicians
Democrats (Brazil) politicians
Party of National Mobilization politicians
Social Democratic Party (Brazil, 2011) politicians
Members of the Federal Senate (Brazil)
Governors of Amazonas (Brazilian state)
Vice Governors of Amazonas (Brazilian state)